Mesen (historically used in English) is a city and municipality located in the Belgian province of West Flanders. On January 1, 2006, Mesen had a total population of 988. The total area is 3.58 km2 which gives a population density of 276 inhabitants per km2.

The municipality comprises only one main settlement, the town of Mesen proper. An exclave to the west of the main territory is surrounded by the municipalities of Heuvelland and Comines-Warneton.

Villages neighbouring the municipality:
 a. Wijtschate (in the municipality of Heuvelland)
 b. Warneton (in the municipality of Comines-Warneton)
 c. Ploegsteert (in the municipality of Comines-Warneton)

Mesen is the smallest city in Belgium. It is a municipality with language facilities.

Mesen is twinned with Featherston in New Zealand in part due to the location of the New Zealand World War I Memorial, which has annual Anzac Day commemorations on 25 April.

History 
In 1062, Adela, wife of Baldwin the Pius, count of Flanders, translated the bones of Saint Sidronius from Rome to Messines.

Three battles were fought over the town during World War I (1914–1918):
Battle of Messines (1914)
Battle of Messines (1917) and Mines in the Battle of Messines
Battle of the Lys (1918)

References

External links

 Official website - in 

Municipalities of West Flanders